Julia Longbottom  (born 13 July 1963) is a British diplomat and the current Ambassador of the United Kingdom to Japan since March 2021. She is the first woman ambassador to represent the United Kingdom in Tokyo.

Education
Longbottom was educated at Bradford Girls' Grammar School in West Yorkshire, and Jesus College, Cambridge, where she gained a Bachelor of Arts degree in French and German. She is also educated in Japanese, Polish and Dutch. In the former she has attained full fluency.

Career

Early career
Longbottom joined the Diplomatic Service at the Foreign and Commonwealth Office (FCO) immediately after graduating from Cambridge in 1986. She then spent her first two years on placements at the United Nations in New York and the European Commission in Brussels. Between 1990 and 1993, she spent her first period in Tokyo as the Political Second Secretary at the British Embassy to Japan. In 1994, she moved to the Foreign and Commonwealth Office's Hong Kong Department and worked as the Section Head for Nationality and Immigration until the handover of Hong Kong to the People's Republic of China in 1997. She was then appointed as the Head of Political and EU Section at the Embassy of the United Kingdom in the Hague.

Recent career
In 2012, Longbottom returned to Tokyo where she served as Deputy Head of Mission at the British Embassy in Tokyo until summer 2016. She then returned to the UK as the FCO's Director for Consular Services, along with a brief period serving as the director of the Foreign, Commonwealth and Development Office's Coronavirus Task Force.

In December 2020, it was announced that Longbottom would replace the retiring Paul Madden as the British Ambassador to Japan. She officially assumed the role in March 2021.

Personal life
Longbottom married Richard Sciver at Bolton Abbey in Wharfedale, North Yorkshire on 28 December 1990 while on leave from her position in Tokyo. Together, Longbottom and Sciver maintain a UK residence in the Royal Borough of Kingston upon Thames. They have three adult children: two daughters and one son. The elder daughter, Nat Sciver-Brunt, is vice captain of the England women's cricket team.

References

1963 births
Living people
Ambassadors of the United Kingdom to Japan
Alumni of Jesus College, Cambridge
Companions of the Order of St Michael and St George
20th-century British diplomats
21st-century British diplomats